Greg Brown (born October 10, 1957) is an American football coach, who is currently an analyst at Analyst. He was previously the Defensive Coordinator at Charlotte. He was previously the secondary coach for Auburn University and the Missouri Tigers. Brown, for one season, was the secondary coach for Alabama. He was hired by the Crimson Tide in January 2013 after he served as defensive coordinator for Colorado. In 2010, he was co-defensive coordinator for the Arizona Wildcats. Before becoming co-defensive coordinator with Tim Kish, he previously served as secondary coach for the Colorado Buffaloes.

References

External links
 Purdue profile

1957 births
Living people
Alabama Crimson Tide football coaches
Arizona Wildcats football coaches
Atlanta Falcons coaches
Colorado Buffaloes football coaches
High school football coaches in Colorado
Louisville Cardinals football coaches
New Orleans Saints coaches
Purdue Boilermakers football coaches
San Francisco 49ers coaches
San Diego Chargers coaches
Sportspeople from Denver
Tampa Bay Buccaneers coaches
Tennessee Titans coaches
United States Football League coaches
UTEP Miners football coaches
UTEP Miners football players
Wyoming Cowboys football coaches
People from Arvada, Colorado
Players of American football from Denver